Myrick is an unincorporated historic community in Umatilla County, Oregon, United States. It is between Pendleton and Helix, just south of Oregon Route 334.

Myrick is a station on the Burlington Northern Railroad that was originally named "Warren". Because of the confusion with Warren in Columbia County, the name was changed to honor Samuel Jackson Myrick, who came to Oregon from Missouri in 1884 and settled in the area. Myrick post office ran from 1902 to 1908. John Myrick was the first postmaster.

The Myrick family became successful wheat farmers in the area.

References

Unincorporated communities in Umatilla County, Oregon
1902 establishments in Oregon
Populated places established in 1902
Unincorporated communities in Oregon